Bichpuri is a village in Agra district of Uttar Pradesh in India. 
Bichpuri is a big village and there are many colleges here

References 

Villages in Agra district